Kninsko Polje is a village near Knin, Šibenik-Knin County, Croatia.

References

Populated places in Šibenik-Knin County
Knin